Newlyweds is a 2011 American comedy drama film written, directed and starring Edward Burns, with Kerry Bishé, Marsha Dietlein, and Caitlin FitzGerald. Newlyweds was selected to close the 2011 Tribeca Film Festival.

Plot
The honeymoon period ends quickly for Buzzy and Katie when Buzzy's sister Linda arrives unannounced to the couples' apartment looking for a place to stay. Linda's arrival complicates Buzzy and Katie's marriage and forces both to re-evaluate their relationship. Linda has particularly come to New York to try to win back her ex-boyfriend, Miles. He originally proposed to her, but she refused. Linda pursues Miles, coerces him into meeting her for a drink. She asks him to leave his current wife and run away with her. Miles reveals his wife is now pregnant. Devastated, Linda goes off with the most random guy named Whitney at the bar. First to Buzzy and Katie's place, but Buzzy chases them both out with a baseball bat. Linda and Whitney then go back to his place. Linda steals Katie's coat and leaves it at Whitney's place. She sneaks out of Whitney's apartment early in the morning. Buzzy confesses what the two were doing.

Linda calls her ex-boyfriend back again, still looking to win him back. When Katie's ex-husband Dara returns with a borrowed vacuum cleaner, Linda totally throws herself into him. She spends the night with him as well. Buzzy sees them together and demands they break up. Buzzy hesitates to tell Katie the news. Meanwhile, Katie's own sister is staying over and Linda flees before either Katie or Marsha finds out that she was with Dara. At one point, where it seems Max is flirting with an employee at the recording studio, Marsha is furious and confronts him about it. Max has grown tired of his marriage to Marsha and wants a divorce. He drops the news over dinner at their usual spot. Max continuously tells his marital and other domestic problems to Buzzy, who just wants to train him at the gym and does not want to hear about his personal life. Buzzy finally refuses to train Max anymore, as he has made no physical improvement whatsoever. Linda dates both Miles and Dara, but she is still pining for Miles. She does have an affair with him. But he ends it. Linda has Dara for a one-night stand.

Buzzy finally drops the bomb that Linda was seeing Dara and both Katie and Marsha are livid. They both blame Buzzy for this. After all that has happened, Katie tells Buzzy she is worried that she has no idea who he really is and they got married too quickly. Katie fears that they will wind up just like Max and Marsha. Katie wants Marsha to leave, but Marsha will not. Buzzy takes Linda to the diner and gives her a considerable amount of money and advice on how to get her life together. Buzzy packs a bag and invites Katie to join him in the car. Finally, she gets in the car with Buzzy as he tells her, "We need to get as far away from our relatives as possible". They drive off.

Cast
 Edward Burns as Buzzy
 Kerry Bishé as Linda
 Marsha Dietlein as Marsha
 Caitlin FitzGerald as Katie
 Max Baker as Max
 Dara Coleman as Dara
 Johnny Solo as Miles

Production
Newlyweds was shot in a faux-documentary style on location in Tribeca, New York City. The movie cost $9,000 to produce and was filmed entirely on a Canon 5D. It is the smallest budget Burns has ever made a movie for. It bombed.

Soundtrack
The soundtrack is composed by PT Walkley.

Reception
The film received generally positive reviews; it holds a 73% positive rating on Rotten Tomatoes based on 11 reviews, with an average score of 6.58/10.

References

External links
 
 

2011 films
2011 romantic comedy-drama films
2011 independent films
American romantic comedy-drama films
American independent films
Films directed by Edward Burns
2011 comedy films
2011 drama films
2010s English-language films
2010s American films